Musayelyan is a village in the Ashotsk Municipality of the Shirak Province of Armenia. The St. Trdat church built in 1896 is located in the village.

Etymology 
The village was previously known as Bozekhush. The village was later renamed after Bolshevik captain  who committed his troops and the armoured train Vardan Zoravar to the May Uprising against the Dashnak government of Armenia in Aleksandropol (Gyumri)—He was imprisoned for several months until the Red Army executed two notable Dashnaks in Zangezur, thus prompting his execution in retaliation.

Economy 
The population engages in animal husbandry, with the cultivation of grain and fodder crops.

Demographics
The population of the village since 1873 is as follows:

References 

Populated places in Shirak Province